Bavaria Film is a German film production and distribution company. It is one of Europe's largest film production companies, with some 30 subsidiaries.

History 
The studios were founded in 1919, when Munich-raised film producer Peter Ostermayr converted the private film company he had founded in 1907, Münchener Lichtspielkunst GmbH, to the public company Münchener Lichtspielkunst AG (Emelka), and acquired a large area (ca. 356.000 m²) for the studios in Geiselgasteig, a district of Munich's southern suburb Grünwald. The company was a direct competitor to UFA, which had begun operations in Berlin in 1917, and quickly absorbed several other film industry companies in the region. In 1930 investor Wilhelm Kraus and a consortium of banks bought a major shareholding in the company, and on 21 September 1932 the group took control and renamed it Bavaria Film AG. In 1938 the Bavaria Film was nationalised but privatised again in 1956.

Bavaria Film GmbH 

Bavaria Film GmbH is a film production company known for television films such as Rainer Werner Fassbinder's Berlin Alexanderplatz (1980) and Wolfgang Petersen's Das Boot (1981), both also shown theatrically. Also producing the Monty Python's Fliegender Zirkus specials for German and Austrian television in Geiselgasteig in 1971 and 1972.

Bavaria Studios 

The company owns the Bavaria Studios in Munich, Germany, where many of its films have been produced, and utilised by a number of notable directors and films.

Other German production companies have also produced films in the studios, including Constantin Film with The Neverending Story, Downfall and Perfume: The Story of a Murderer.

Bavaria Filmstadt 
The Filmstadt is an attraction for tourists that offers visitors a studio tour to see sets and props from The Neverending Story, Das Boot, Marienhof and other productions.

References

External links
 Bavaria Film GmbH
 Bavaria Studios & Production Services GmbH
 Bavaria Filmstadt

Mass media companies established in 1919
German film studios
Film production companies of Germany
Mass media in Munich
Tourist attractions in Munich
Companies based in Munich
German brands
1919 establishments in Germany